Barnyard (also known as Barnyard: The Original Party Animals) is a 2006 computer-animated comedy film produced by Nickelodeon Movies and O Entertainment and distributed by Paramount Pictures, and the first installment in the Barnyard franchise. The film is directed, produced, and written by Steve Oedekerk, the co-creator of Nickelodeon Movies and O Entertainment's Jimmy Neutron: Boy Genius (2001) and its television series continuation The Adventures of Jimmy Neutron, Boy Genius. The film stars the voices of Kevin James, Courteney Cox, Sam Elliott, Danny Glover, Wanda Sykes, Andie MacDowell, and David Koechner. It tells the story of Otis, a carefree bull (erroneously referred to as a cow by other characters) who learns the value of responsibility when he becomes the leader of his farm home's community after his adoptive father's death from a coyote attack.

The film began development in 2002, and was released on August 4, 2006 in the United States. The film received highly mixed reviews from critics; the Rotten Tomatoes critical consensus describes it as "unimaginative and unfunny". The film was also criticized for its innacurate depiction of bulls with udders. However, it grossed $116.5 million worldwide against a $51 million production budget. Additionally, it spawned a television series, Back at the Barnyard, which ran on Nickelodeon and later Nicktoons for two seasons.

Plot
Otis is a mischievous, carefree bull who lives on a farm where, unbeknownst to humans, the animals are anthropomorphic. He prefers having fun with his best friends — Pip the mouse, Freddy the ferret, Peck the rooster, and Pig the pig — rather than following strict rules and accepting responsibility. This annoys his stern adoptive father Ben, the leader of the farm's community. After Otis interrupts a routine morning roll call and meeting with his usual antics, Ben admonishes Otis that he will never find happiness unless he acts more maturely. That same day, Otis meets a widowed pregnant cow named Daisy, who has moved to the farm with her friend Bessy.

That night, the animals throw a wild party in the barn while Ben and Otis guard the fence line. Otis convinces Ben to relieve him; Ben tells him that, the night he found Otis as a calf, the stars appeared to dance. Soon after, Ben is attacked by a pack of coyotes led by Dag. He fends them off but is fatally injured. Otis is alerted and runs outside to his father, who soon dies from his injuries. Early the next morning, the farmer buries Ben's body on the hill, and after he leaves, the other animals gather at Ben's grave to mourn the loss of their leader.

The animals elect Otis as their new leader, but he shirks his duties by leaving Freddy and Peck in charge of the coop. With the help of three trouble-making Jersey cows, he seeks revenge on a mean-spirited youngster nicknamed "Snotty Boy" for cow tipping Otis, then eludes the police. Later that night, Otis shares a romantic moment with Daisy, who reveals that she and Bessy are the only surviving members of their herd after a flood. Otis comforts her, then witnesses the coyotes chasing a rabbit, and he leaves to seek revenge on them. After engaging them to no avail, Dag recognizes Otis as Ben’s son, taunting him with how he let his father die by leaving his post to party. Taking advantage of Otis' lack of strength, Dag proposes a deal: he and his pack will take some of the farm's animals at random times, and if Otis tries to intervene, the coyotes will openly kill them all. Realizing his chances for victory are slim, Otis ultimately decides to leave the farm and start a new life in the city going by the name milkman.

The next morning, before leaving, Otis is informed that the coyotes have kidnapped the hens, including Maddy, a chick who looks up to him. Otis, not having expected the coyotes to arrive until nightfall, sets out to the coyotes' junkyard den to confront them. He gains the upper hand until Dag bites his leg, but luckily many of the barnyard's animals arrive to help him. Dag tries to attack Otis from behind, but he is alerted when Peck, who has struggled with his crow throughout the film, successfully crows a warning. Otis thwarts Dag's attack and warns him to never return to the farm before sending him flying out of the junkyard.

On their way home, Pip informs Otis that Daisy went into labor after he left. The animals steal a biker gang's motorcycles and return to the barnyard in time to welcome Daisy's calf, whom she names "Li'l Ben". Otis takes full responsibility as the new leader of the farm community as he watches the stars in the night sky take the form of himself, Daisy, and Li'l Ben dancing.

Cast
 Kevin James as Otis, a bull (though he, Ben, and the other male cattle are known as cows by other characters) leader of the farm.
 Courteney Cox as Daisy, a kind-hearted widowed cow and Otis' love interest.
 Sam Elliott as Ben, a stern and uptight bull and Otis' adoptive father.
 Danny Glover as Miles, an elderly mule and Ben's best friend.
 Wanda Sykes as Bessy, a sassy cow and Daisy's friend.
 Andie MacDowell as Etta, one of the farm's hens and Maddy's mother.
 David Koechner as Dag, the sadistic leader of a coyote pack seeking to hunt and eat the farm's animals, namely the hens.
 Jeffrey Garcia as Pip, a wisecracking mouse who is one of Otis' friends.
 Tino Insana as Pig, a pig who is one of Otis' friends. (Last film role)
 Dom Irrera as Duke, the farm's sheepdog.
 Cam Clarke as Freddy, a panicky and neurotic ferret who is one of Otis' friends.
 Rob Paulsen as Peck, a rooster who is one of Otis' friends.
 Paulsen also voices a gopher and one of the pizza twins.
 S. Scott Bullock as Eddy, a member of the Jersey Cows.
 John DiMaggio as Bud, a member of the Jersey Cows.
 DiMaggio also voices Frederick O'Hanlon, a local police officer.
 Maurice LaMarche as Igg, a member of the Jersey Cows.
 Fred Tatasciore as Farmer Buyer, the owner of the farm that Otis and his friends live on.
 Madeline Lovejoy as Maddy, Etta's daughter who looks up to Otis.
 Earthquake as Root, a handsome rooster.
 Steve Oedekerk as Eugene “Snotty-Boy” Goldner, the Beadys' nephew who is cruel to animals.
 Oedekerk also voices Nathaniel Randall "Nathan" Beady III, the farmer's neighbor, Nora's husband and the reluctant uncle of Snotty Boy; Reginald Goldner, Snotty Boy's father; and one of the pizza twins.
 Maria Bamford as Noreen "Nora" Beady, Nathan's wife and the aunt of Snotty Boy.
 Jill Talley as Serena Goldner, Snotty Boy's mother.
 Laraine Newman and Katie Leigh as Snotty Boy's friends.

Archival recordings of Shaggy's "Boombastic" were used for the performance of mouse rapper Biggie Cheese.

The chicks were portrayed by Eliana Bendetson, Paul Butcher, Khamani Griffin, Arlo Levin, Liliana Mumy, Cydney Neal, Cat Ozawa, Thomas Pistor, Isaiah Tefilo, and George Van Newkirk.

Additional voices were provided by Keith Anthony, Julianne Buescher, William Calvert, Chad Einbinder, Leigh French, Eddie Frierson, Nika Futterman, Nicholas Guest, Archie Hahn, Katie Leigh, Christie Mellor, Jacqueline Pinol, Phil Proctor, Justin Shenkarow, Lynne Marie Stewart, Audrey Wasilewski and Claudette Wells.

Release
Paramount Pictures released Barnyard in the United States theaters on August 4, 2006. It grossed approximately between $116.5 million and $118.6 million at the worldwide box office, against a budget of $51 million.

Home media
Barnyard was released by Paramount Home Entertainment on DVD on December 12, 2006 in separate widescreen and full-screen versions. The DVD includes the alternate opening, a "Barnyard Bop" music video, a comic book creator, and a commentary by Steve Oedekerk and Paul Marshal. The film's DVD release has been constantly reprinted later on. After 16 years, Barnyard was released on Blu-ray for the first time on January 25, 2022.

Reception

Critical reception
The website's critical consensus reads, "Unimaginative and unfunny, this tale of barnyard mischief borders on 'udder' creepiness and adds little to this summer's repertoire of animated films." On Metacritic, it has a score of 42 out of 100 based on 24 critics, indicating "mixed or average reviews". Audiences polled by CinemaScore gave the film an average grade of "B+" on an A+ to F scale.

Roger Moore of the Orlando Sentinel gave the film 2 stars out of 5, saying that, "with Barnyard, another quick-and-dirty 'all-star cast' mess churned out by the digital start-ups hired to steal some of Pixar's cash, the year that computer-generated animation 'jumps the shark' becomes official. Politically correct, anatomically incorrect and ugly to look at, the only thing that saves Barnyard is writer (and director) Steve Oedekerk's gift for gags and almost-edgy humor." Kyle Smith of the New York Post gave the film a score of 1.5/4, saying that "if you want to punish your kids, send them to bed without dinner. If you want to disturb, frighten and depress them while making sure they fail biology, take them to the animated feature Barnyard." Gregory Kirschling of Entertainment Weekly criticized the film's plot, giving it a C+ score and said that "it feels like Barnyard swipes too much of its plot from The Lion King."

On the positive side, J. R. Jones of the Chicago Reader enjoyed Barnyard, saying that "it's way funnier than many of the R-rated comedies I've seen lately, though Oedekerk seems to have ignored the writer's edict to know your subject—most of his cows are male. The CGI is excellent, with characters whose depth and solidity suggest Nick Park's clay animations. The laughs subside near the end as the requisite moral kicks in, but this is still that rare kids' movie I'd recommend to parents and non-parents alike." Claudia Puig of USA Today gave the film a score of 2.5/4, calling it "a sweet and mildly funny movie that will entertain young audiences, but one aspect is utterly mystifying: The two main characters, father and son bovine creatures, have large, distracting udders."

Box office
Barnyard grossed $72.6 million domestically and $43.9 million internationally for a worldwide total of $116.5 million against its production budget of $51 million.

The film opened at #2 at the box office on its opening weekend behind Talladega Nights: The Ballad of Ricky Bobby, earning $16 million at the domestic box office from 3,311 theaters. On the film's second weekend, it dropped 38.7%, grossing $9.7 million and finishing in 4th place, behind Talladega Nights: The Ballad of Ricky Bobby, Step Up, and World Trade Center. By its closing on November 2, 2006, it grossed almost $73 million in its domestic theatrical release.

Accolades

Soundtrack

The film's score is done by John Debney, who also previously scored Jimmy Neutron: Boy Genius (2001). The soundtrack was released on August 22, 2006 by Bulletproof Records. It includes an original song by indie pop band the Starlight Mints and "You Gotta Move" by Aerosmith.

Track listing

Other songs featured in the film:
 "The Barnyard Dance" - Lewis Arquette and Family
 "You Gotta Move" - Aerosmith
 "Sister Rosetta" - Alabama 3
 "Slow Ride" - Paul D. Calder (as Paul Calder)
 "Truck Song" - Paul D. Calder (as Paul Calder)

Video game

A video game based on the film was produced by THQ and Blue Tongue Entertainment. It is an adventure game in which the player names their own male or female cow and walk around the barnyard and play mini-games, pull pranks on humans, and ride bikes. The game was released for PlayStation 2, Nintendo GameCube, Wii, PC, Game Boy Advance, and Nintendo DS.

Spin-off television series

On September 29, 2007, a television series based on the film, titled Back at the Barnyard, premiered on Nickelodeon. Chris Hardwick replaced Kevin James in the role of Otis, and Leigh-Allyn Baker voiced new character Abby, who replaced Daisy. The series had a considerably lighter tone than the film. The series ran for two seasons, and ended on November 12, 2011.

References

External links

 
 
 
 
 
 

Back at the Barnyard
2006 films
2006 animated films
2006 computer-animated films
2000s American animated films
2000s children's comedy films
American children's animated comedy films
American computer-animated films
American comedy films
Animated films about orphans
Fictional farms
Films about cattle
Films about Canis
Films adapted into television shows
Films set on farms
Internet memes
Nickelodeon animated films
Nickelodeon Movies films
Paramount Pictures animated films
Paramount Pictures films
Films scored by John Debney
Films directed by Steve Oedekerk
Films with screenplays by Steve Oedekerk
2006 comedy films
Internet memes introduced in 2016
Film and television memes
2000s English-language films